William A. Tremayne (died December 3, 1939) was an American playwright and screenwriter.

References

External links
W.A. Tremayne on IMDb

1939 deaths
Writers from Portland, Maine
Screenwriters from Maine
American male dramatists and playwrights
American male screenwriters
20th-century American dramatists and playwrights
20th-century American screenwriters
20th-century American male writers